Ivar Slik (born 27 May 1993) is a Dutch racing cyclist, who last rode for UCI Continental team . He rode at the 2014 UCI Road World Championships. He is the brother of racing cyclist Rozanne Slik.

Major results

2011
 2nd Time trial, National Junior Road Championships
 3rd Overall Trofeo Karlsberg
2012
 1st Ronde van Midden-Nederland
 1st Prologue Istrian Spring Trophy
 2nd Overall Le Triptyque des Monts et Châteaux
1st  Young rider classification
 5th Overall Tour of China I
 7th Zellik–Galmaarden
2014
 2nd Antwerpse Havenpijl
 7th Arnhem–Veenendaal Classic
2018
 1st Stage 3 Tour of Fuzhou
 8th Slag om Norg
2019
 1st  Mountains classification Paris–Arras Tour
 1st Prologue Sibiu Cycling Tour
 1st Stage 1 Tour of Romania
 1st Stage 3 Tour of Fuzhou
 3rd Slag om Norg
 7th Midden–Brabant Poort Omloop
 8th PWZ Zuidenveld Tour
 10th Skive–Løbet
2021 
 1st  Sprints classification Presidential Tour of Turkey
2022
 1st Unbound Gravel 200

References

External links
 

1993 births
Living people
Dutch male cyclists
Sportspeople from Utrecht (city)
UCI Road World Championships cyclists for the Netherlands
Cyclists from Utrecht (province)
21st-century Dutch people